Sven Morisbak (born 8 April 1972) is a retired Norwegian football midfielder.

He is a son of Andreas Morisbak and grew up at Hosle in Bærum. In 1990 he won the Norwegian U20 Cup with Lyn, together with players like Axel Kolle, Jan Derek Sørensen, Ola Dybwad-Olsen, Jr., Thomas Wæhler, Glenn Hartmann and Henrik Rønnevig. He made his senior debut for Lyn in 1994, and got 11 Eliteserien games in 1997. He was also loaned out to Stjørdals-Blink. In 1998 he joined second-tier team Ullern IF, later fourth-tier team Bygdø Monolitten IL.

References

1972 births
Living people
Sportspeople from Bærum
Norwegian footballers
Lyn Fotball players
IL Stjørdals-Blink players
Ullern IF players
Norwegian First Division players
Eliteserien players
Association football midfielders